is a former Japanese footballer who last played for SC Sagamihara on loan from Thespakusatsu Gunma in the J3 League.

Career statistics
Updated to 23 February 2017.

1Includes Japanese Super Cup and FIFA Club World Cup.

Honours

Club
Sanfrecce Hiroshima
J. League Division 1 (2) : 2012, 2013
Japanese Super Cup (1): 2013

References

External links

Profile at SC Sagamihara

1988 births
Living people
Ryutsu Keizai University alumni
Association football people from Tokyo
Japanese footballers
J1 League players
J2 League players
J3 League players
Mito HollyHock players
Sanfrecce Hiroshima players
Vegalta Sendai players
Oita Trinita players
Thespakusatsu Gunma players
SC Sagamihara players
Association football defenders